Naver Whale (Hangul: 네이버 웨일) is a freeware web browser developed by South Korean technology company Naver Corporation, which is available in English and Korean. It became available on Android on April 13, 2018.

Features
Since the browser has been based on Chromium since its inception in 2011, Google Chrome apps are compatible with the browser.

Pages can be translated through its Naver Papago service and can translate from Korean, Japanese, and many other languages.

The Naver Whale browser has its own extensions that can be accessed through the Whale Store.

Naver Whale Browser offers the ability called Whale On to conduct video conferencing without worrying about time limits. Up to 500 people can access at the same time, and various functions such as screen sharing and microphone/camera control are available.

References

External links

Web browsers
Cross-platform web browsers
Windows web browsers
MacOS web browsers
Linux web browsers
Android web browsers
Naver Corporation